Listronotus dietzi is a species of underwater weevil in the beetle family Curculionidae. It is found in North America, specifically in the United States within the state of Louisiana.

References

Further reading

 
 

Cyclominae
Articles created by Qbugbot
Beetles described in 1979